Zuffa, LLC is an American sports promotion company specializing in mixed martial arts. It was founded in January 2001 in Las Vegas, Nevada, by Station Casinos executives Frank Fertitta III and Lorenzo Fertitta to be the parent entity of the Ultimate Fighting Championship (UFC) after they purchased it from the Semaphore Entertainment Group. The word "Zuffa" is an Italian word, meaning "fight". On July 11, 2016, Zuffa announced that it would be purchased by a group led by WME-IMG including Silver Lake Partners, Kohlberg Kravis Roberts and MSD Capital for the price of $4.025 billion.

Relationship with MMA organizations

International Fight League
Throughout the existence of the International Fight League (IFL) between 2006 and 2008, both Zuffa and the IFL had competed in a hostile relationship. Zuffa accused the IFL and sued them for illegally using proprietary information obtained by hiring executives from the UFC organization. The IFL responded with their own suit claiming that Zuffa was threatening potential partners not to work with the IFL, including Fox Sports Net (a deal with Fox Sports was later signed before resolution of the suit). The tension between the IFL and the UFC worsened with accusations that the IFL had attempted to buy out several top UFC fighters.

In July 2008, there were reports of the IFL's possible purchase by the UFC. That same month, Joe Favorito, former IFL senior vice president, cited financial troubles for the closing of the company on July 31, 2008. Anonymous sources stated that Zuffa had bought the IFL.  Other reports cited the UFC's airing of IFL footage on its programming, and the signing of previous IFL fighters, as an indirect confirmation of the purchase.

WFA
On December 11, 2006, Zuffa acquired the assets of the World Fighting Alliance, and formed WFA Enterprises, LLC. as a subsidiary to handle these assets, including select fighter contracts. On the same day, it was reported that Zuffa was formalizing plans to buy World Extreme Cagefighting, to be run as a separate promotion from the UFC.

WEC
Following the purchase of the WEC, Zuffa made several changes to the promotion. This included modifying the WEC's cage, transferring to a focus on lighter weight classes, giving it the ability to host events in Las Vegas, and having the championships of fighters who were contracted UFC fighters vacated. From 2007 to the end of 2010, the WEC was run as a separate promotion under the Zuffa banner, airing events 28 to 53 on Versus in the US and on The Score in Canada. On October 28, 2010, Dana White announced that the WEC would be absorbed into the UFC in early 2011.

Pride Fighting Championships

On March 27, 2007, it was announced that Frank Fertitta III and Lorenzo Fertitta were acquiring the assets of Pride Fighting Championships, the UFC's largest rival, from Dream Stage Entertainment. To handle the take over, the Fertitta brothers created a new corporate entity to handle the assets, Pride FC Worldwide Holdings LLC. With common ownership in place, Zuffa and Pride Worldwide would be working closely together. Although goals of reviving Pride were not realized, many of Pride's assets, including contracts with fighters and intellectual property, are now regularly utilized by the UFC.

Strikeforce
On March 12, 2011, it was announced that Zuffa had purchased Strikeforce in a deal made with partial owner Silicon Valley Sports and Entertainment. The amount of money involved has not been officially disclosed, however, it has been reported that the deal was worth $40 million. The deal included licensing rights, fighter contracts, and the Strikeforce video library. Strikeforce continued to operate as a separate company, similar to that of the WEC, until January 12, 2013. After the final show was held in Oklahoma City, the promotion was dissolved and several fighter contracts were absorbed into the UFC.

United Glory
When United Glory was originally formed in 2006, it was known as Ultimate Glory before a lawsuit with Zuffa forced a name change.

Invicta Fighting Championships
In June 2014 the UFC announced that they had signed a multi-year, multi-event broadcast deal to show and archive all Invicta FC events on UFC Fight Pass. This has allowed the UFC to further expand its women's divisions by adding a strawweight division in July 2014, and signing Invicta fighters such as Carla Esparza and Felice Herrig.

Shooto
In June 2014 the UFC announced that they had signed a development deal with the recently revived, Vale Tudo Japan. A brand that was brought back in 2012 by the long running, Shooto promotion. The UFC plans on promoting and operating a new tournament series that will focus on 135 and 145 pound divisions. There were plans of a The Ultimate Fighter-like TV show to help promote these tournaments but it is unclear on what the status remains on it.

Relationship With non-MMA organizations

Flash Entertainment
On January 12, 2010, Zuffa sold a minority interest in the company to Flash Entertainment.  The company announced the completion of a deal in which a 10-percent interest in the company to the Abu Dhabi government-owned Flash Entertainment.  With the sale, company ownership would be 40.5 percent held by Lorenzo Fertitta, the company's CEO and chairman, 40.5 percent held by his older brother, Frank Fertitta III, 10 percent by Flash Entertainment and nine percent by Dana White.  Flash Entertainment was formed in 2008 by the Abu Dhabi government's Executive Affairs Authority.

Ubisoft
In December 2010, Zuffa filed a lawsuit against video game publisher Ubisoft, for what they claimed was a violation of trademark on the game, Fighters Uncaged, packaging.  On the packaging of the game the trademarked term, "Ultimate Fighting" is shown in all capital letters. Zuffa claimed that the use of the term is identical or confusingly similar to the use of the UFC's trademarks. While Ubisoft failed to provide any comments on the lawsuit, by August 2011, the two companies announced the dissolution of the lawsuit.

Lone Survivor Foundation
In May 2011, it was announced that Zuffa would be holding a charity auction featuring more than 100 items to benefit the Lone Survivor Foundation during the last week of May 2011. All products were autographed by UFC fighters and included baseball caps, T-shirts, MMA gloves, and DVDs. Products generally ranged in price from $50 to a few thousand dollars.

Cleveland Clinic brain trauma study
In February 2014, Zuffa was one of a number of major combat sport promotions to support a major brain trauma study that was being conducted by the Cleveland Clinic. This was further followed up in February 2016, when Zuffa donated a million dollars to the Ruvo Center.

MMA regulations
The current rules used in the UFC were first established by the New Jersey Athletic Control Board in 2000, in consultation with the UFC and other MMA promotions in the United States. The first UFC event under the new rules was UFC 28, held before Zuffa's takeover. New Jersey's Unified Rules of Mixed Martial Arts has since been established throughout the country by other state athletic commissions, including Nevada and California. The UFC has, however, kept close ties with state commissions, especially the Nevada State Athletic Commission, of which Lorenzo Fertitta is a former board member.

Drug policy efforts
During the early years of mixed martial arts, when Pride Fighting Championships along with the Ultimate Fighting Championship were early premierships of the sport, it has been documented that there was a noteworthy lack of rules and regulations regarding drug testing for performance-enhancing drugs. This led to a widespread debate and discussion regarding how prevalent the use of steroids were in the sport, as well as a long list of competitors in the UFC and other major organizations facing failed drug tests. This was further highlighted by continued problems with UFC champions, including Jon Jones and Anderson Silva, failing drug tests. So in February 2015, Zuffa announced a more aggressive year round, random-testing approach for its competitors to begin in July 2015.

Anti-piracy efforts
Zuffa has been one of the largest and most aggressive spenders among anti-piracy political lobbyists in the United States since the end of the 2000s. One thing in particular that sets them apart from other sports leagues is that, in addition to supporting efforts of stricter piracy laws, they have also on numerous occasions gone after selected individuals in addition to pirate hosting websites. Some of the most notable cases have included, a well publicized lawsuit with Justin.tv in 2011 and a $32 million settlement involving a New York man in 2014.

Zuffa has always maintained the stance that the large amounts of illegal streams of their events causes massive financial losses. In response to having such a stringent stance it has been extremely controversial and has caused a number of debates within the mixed martial arts community on its effectiveness. As a result, the UFC began experimenting on an online subscription model known as UFC Fight Pass in 2014. It is unclear how beneficial the service has been since its emphasis has been largely minimal next to UFC's partnership with Fox and noticeable decline in average PPV buyrates, highlighted by the S&P downgrading Zuffa's credit rating in late 2014.

Insurance policy
On May 9, 2011, it was announced that Zuffa would be providing year-round customized insurance coverage for any injury suffered by a UFC or Strikeforce athlete. The policy covers any injuries that occur during competition, training, and non-training related accidents. The policy was underwritten by Houston-based specialty insurance group HCC Insurance Holdings and went into effect on June 1, 2011.

The details of the policy include:
 Coverage for all athletes signed by the UFC or Strikeforce.
 Coverage for athletes residing both within and outside of the United States.
 Zuffa paying for all premiums for the policy, with athletes not required to pay anything.
 Allowing athletes to use up to $50,000 in annual coverage for any injuries that occur while under contract to Zuffa. This includes services such as, doctor services, laboratory tests, emergency medical evacuation, and physical therapy.
 Coverage for athletes regardless of if they are scheduled to compete.
 Life and dental insurance at no cost to the athletes.
 No coverage for minor illnesses, but training-related illnesses like staph infections are covered.

An insurance policy is not a first for mixed martial arts or combat sports as a whole. Former promotions such as the International Fight League, offered insurance to its athletes. However Zuffa's policy is the first to cover a large group of combat sport athletes. According to UFC president Dana White, the policy was a goal of the company since Zuffa first purchased the UFC in 2001. In addition UFC chairman and CEO, Lorenzo Fertitta stated that the policy took three years to establish while trying to find possible insurers. Prior to the introduction of this policy, Zuffa provided up to $100,000 for an athlete on each event to cover injuries sustained during competition. However, if an athlete was injured outside of competition they would have to pay for their own medical expenses.

Notable incidents where UFC athletes were injured outside of competition include,
 Frank Mir, who was struck by a car while riding his motorcycle in 2004, and forced out of competition for over 20 months.
 Brock Lesnar, who was forced out of action for several months while struggling with diverticulitis.

Monopoly accusations
The Ultimate Fighting Championship has been accused of monopolistic business practices both in casual criticism and in formal lawsuits for a number of years. There are numerous fighters who have accused the company of various wrongdoing's regarding issues including unequal pay, predatory actions toward rival promotions, lack of a pension or union safety net, and other perceived unethical business practices. These perceptions have been most highlighted by a Federal Trade Commission investigation that took place between 2011 and 2012. As well as in a series of class action lawsuits filed against the company in late 2014 and early 2015.

Federal Trade Commission investigation
In the months following the March 2011 acquisition of rival promotion Strikeforce, rumours began to circulate that a possible investigation by the FTC would take place. These rumours later came to be true when it was officially announced around the end of January 2012 that the FTC had in fact conducted an investigation, and found no wrongdoings regarding the UFC being a monopoly.

Class action lawsuits
2014

On December 16, 2014, a class action lawsuit was filed against Zuffa by fighters Cung Le, Jon Fitch and Nate Quarry. Within a few days, Javier Vazquez and Dennis Hallman filed a second class action. And on December 24, Brandon Vera and Pablo Garza filed a third lawsuit. Shortly after the initial news spreading, Zuffa quickly responded following the first class action with the statement that, "The UFC will vigorously defend itself and its business practices." This soon led other promoters such as Scott Coker, President of Bellator MMA, expressing an interest in the outcome of the lawsuit, while rejecting his organization as being labeled a "minor league" as was done several times in the initial filing. By the end of December 2014, the UFC made a formal statement stating, "We are proud of the company we have built, confident in our legal position, and intend to prevail in this lawsuit."

2015

On February 7, 2015, a fourth lawsuit was filed against the UFC, this one by Mac Danzig and Gabe Ruediger. It was around this time that Zuffa motioned to move the hearing date from May 7 to March 26, as well as to move the venue from Northern California to Las Vegas, where they are headquartered. A few weeks later, Zuffa motioned to have the lawsuits dismissed, in four separate documents they claim, "The Complaints' vague and conclusory allegations fall far short of the Supreme Court's requirements in Bell Atlantic Corp. v. Twombly, for pleading specific facts showing a plausible antitrust claim."

Shortly thereafter, a fifth lawsuit was added by Kyle Kingsbury and Darren Uyenoyama on March 20, 2015. On April 12, the plaintiff athletes filed an opposition to February's motion to dismiss and transfer. Following the May 7 hearing regarding the motion to change venue, a Californian federal judge granted Zuffa the motion to change venue to Las Vegas after citing contract agreements from the former employees. As a result of the change of venue to Nevada, Zuffa was denied its motion to remain a discovery for 15 years of its financial records. This would prompt a debate, especially by MMAFA founder Rob Maysey, on who should have access to the UFC's sensitive information and how that information should be viewed.

Both sides have argued for different criteria, so as not to put them at an disadvantage. However, Zuffa has requested a two-tiered system of confidentiality: confidential and highly confidential. They have stated they feel that Maysey's access to highly confidential information could have an influential impact on him and his role in the MMAFA. Meanwhile, Maysey has openly stated his goal is to represent the fighters and ultimately try to get a reform similar to the Ali Act of 2000.

Moving forward to September 25, 2015, due to the gradual nature and complications regarding the lawsuit; Zuffa requested another dismissal of the case and asked that it be thrown out of Las Vegas federal court. In a surprise bench ruling, this was ultimately denied, which promoted the UFC to release a formal response. The following week, magistrate judge Peggy Leen ruled that the UFC could not prevent plaintiffs attorney Rob Maysey from viewing its most highly confidential and sensitive business and financial information. This has officially caused an expert discovery that is estimated to last from 12–16 months (September 2016 to January 2017). In doing so, both parties will have to hand over various highly confidential and sensitive documents.

The goal of the expert discovery is to determine three key factors for antitrust liability to all hold true: (1) Does the UFC have monopoly power? (2) Did the UFC acquire or maintain such power through exclusionary conduct? (3) Did the UFC cause antitrust injury since having a monopoly is not always illegal in the United States? This is expected to involve a wide range of important figures (past and present) in both mixed martial arts and boxing, including most top ranked UFC staff, Scott Coker, Bjorn Rebney, Ray Sefo, Frank Shamrock, Fedor Emelianenko, Randy Couture, Ben Askren, Mark Cuban, Oscar De La Hoya, Bob Arum, Lou DiBella, Bob Meyrowitz, Ken Hershman and even various PRIDE FC executives. Following this ruling through the end of 2015, both sides have provided well over 100,000 documents.

2016

Starting in January, the UFC defense team filed its official answer, denying the fighters’ antitrust claims. In an amended complaint, which contained nearly identical legal and economic substance to the original version from December 2014. The only major difference being the number of plaintiff fighters has declined from eleven to six. Pablo Garza, Gabe Ruediger, Darren Uyenoyama, Dennis Hallman, and Mac Danzig all dropped out of the lawsuit while the original three plaintiffs, Cung Le, Nate Quarry, and Jon Fitch, remain along with Brandon Vera, Javier Vazquez, and Kyle Kingsbury. In addition, Zuffa has stood by its point of protecting its brand. Additionally, the UFC inadvertently produced PRIDE FC acquisition materials.

Following this in October, Zuffa made a motion to dismiss the consolidated complaint, which was ultimately denied.

2017 and 2018

By this point of the lawsuit, there was considerably less notable coverage of the case. Aside from the occasional legal filings, the first of which being in February 2018 in which the plaintiffs field a motion for class certification which faced opposition from Zuffa. Furthered in September, when the plaintiffs filed their opposition to Zuffa's motion for summary judgment.

Before finally on December 5, 2018 when the plaintiffs held an informational session to cover the status of the lawsuit in Las Vegas, Nevada.

2019

All of which led to some major breaking news in regards to financial information about Zuffa being revealed once hearings started place in August and September. At this point the case included 12 plaintiffs attorneys, two from Bellator MMA, and two from Top Rank. As they intend to look into the business practices used by Zuffa throughout the years towards other MMA promotions throughout the 2000s. Who often have placed some level of blame of their demise on Zuffa.

Some of the most notable revelations included:
 The WME-IMG purchase for the UFC in 2016 was for $4 billion. As was speculated at the time of purchase.
 Athlete compensation ranged from 18.6% to 20.5% during 2011 to 2013. Compared to Strikeforce's wage share being around 63% and Bellator's around 44.7%. In addition, evidence was provided that showed that Zuffa made it part of their business strategy to keep athlete compensation below 25%.
 Yearly revenue, PPV, and other financial figures for most of the time Zuffa owned the company.
 Detailed accounts of negotiation tactics used on particular athletes.
 Zuffa paid former Pride Fighting Championships CEO Nobuyuki Sakakibara $10 million for a 7-year non-compete clause.

Sale to Endeavor
Around May 11, 2016, ESPN's Darren Rovell reported that Goldman Sachs was helping Zuffa set up a sale of its majority ownership to one of four bidders at a speculated price range between $3.5 billion to $4 billion. Immediately after Rovell reported this, UFC President Dana White went on The Dan Patrick Show and denied that the UFC was up for sale, claiming that Zuffa was more focused on "working on deals and our expansion globally" than selling the promotion. However, White would further add that Zuffa would be listening to offers if they met the reported $4 billion. Despite White's denial of a potential sale, Dave Meltzer of SB Nation's mmafighting.com reported a month later that the sale of the UFC was imminent, as Zuffa received two bids within the range of $3.9 billion to $4.2 billion from both WME-IMG, the events  and China Media Capital.

Finally, on July 11, after months of speculation, the UFC released a statement confirming that Zuffa had sold its majority stake to an ownership group headed by WME-IMG for $4.2 billion.  ESPN's Darren Rovell and Brett Okamoto would go on further to report that, despite the sale to WME-IMG, Dana White would be staying on with the UFC as President and would "be given a stake in the new business."  They would also add that the Abu Dhabi-based Flash Entertainment would still maintain its 10 percent stake in the company. In 2017, WME-IMG reorganized as Endeavor. On April 29, 2021, Endeavor launched an initial public offering (IPO) and became a publicly traded company listed on New York Stock Exchange. Endeavor subsequently used some of the proceeds from the IPO to buy out Zuffa's other shareholders at a value of $1.7 billion, making Zuffa a wholly-owned subsidiary of Endeavor.

References

Entertainment companies established in 2001
Mixed martial arts organizations
Ultimate Fighting Championship
Privately held companies based in the Las Vegas Valley
Companies based in Las Vegas
Sports event promotion companies
2016 mergers and acquisitions